Cristina Córdova (b. 1976) is an American-born, Puerto Rican sculptor who works and lives in Penland, North Carolina.

Biography
Córdova was born in Boston, Massachusetts. Her parents were Puerto Ricans completing their studies in Medicine at Harvard University. They returned to Puerto Rico when she was 6 months old. She grew up taking in the rich and layered imagery of the Catholic church. The powerful iconography would come to inspire her work and her view of the world.

Education
Córdova graduated from the Academia del Perpetuo Socorro, Miramar, Puerto Rico in 1994 and earned a Bachelor of Arts and a concentration in Fine Arts from the University of Puerto Rico, Mayaguez Campus in 1998. During the summer of 1999 she finished courses at Touchtone School of Crafts at the New York State College of Ceramics at Alfred University. That same summer she completed courses at the Haystack Mountain School of Crafts in Deer Isle, Maine. Later, she began studies as a special student in independent studies at the New York State College of Ceramics at Alfred University. She was supervised by Wayne Higby and Walter McConnell. She earned a scholarship to Alfred University for her master's degree in ceramics in 2000. She  earned a Masters of Fine Arts from New York State College of Ceramics.
 Alfred University, Alfred, NY, M.F.A. in Ceramics, 2002. 
 Special Student at Alfred University, Alfred, NY, August 1999 - May 2000. 
 Colegio De Agricultura y Artes Mecanicas, B.A. magna cum laude, Mayaguyez, Puerto Rico, June 1998. 
 Extracurricular courses: Florence Academy of Art, Penland School of Crafts.
 Haystack Mountain School of Crafts, Deer Isle, Maine, 1999.

Career
Córdova was on track to becoming an engineer when she realized that it wasn't for her. She switched to art school, where she could pursue her interest in ceramics. After graduating in 2002 she was selected to serve as a resident artist at Penland School of Crafts. Córdova moved to Penland, North Carolina to participate in the residency in 2002. After completing her residency she and her family made their home and studio on the Penland campus where she maintains her studio and offers workshops.

Work

"Córdova doesn't want to be labeled a Puerto Rican artist – or a woman artist, or any type of artist, other than a compelling one – she does believe authenticity can come only from a deeply personal place." Her Afro-Caribbean heritage and her understanding of contemporary and historical influences have impacted her art form. Her knowledge of early Roman life and African sculptures are also reflected in her figures. Among the artists which have impacted her work are Doug Jeck, Judy Fox, Jaime Suarez and Susana Espinosa. She comments about her own work that "we are all taking from a collective creativity."

The human figure is key to her work which has been described as "a compelling strain of magical realism ... laden with ideas of creation, crucifixion and difficult nature of existence." She works primarily with clay but has an interest in working with other mediums. Her moldings recreate various human forms, often female. She has also recreated animal-like creatures. At the abstract level, her figures, represent the struggles in the world of today. Cordóva weaves the past with the present as she creates a place for the viewer to complete the narrative in her work.

“I was born into a household that both challenged and upheld gender archetypes. This simultaneity created a fluid identity in my creative perspective that has moved me to engage with a wide spectrum of narrative embodiments from the sexually untethered and universal to the absolutely feminine. I am human, I am Puerto Rican, I am a woman. Each of these breaks into a thousand fractals that create the prism through which my work comes into the world.”  Cordova's more recent description of her work and process shows a coalescence and embracing of heritage and gender.

Córdova's work is in the collection of the Mint Museum Auxiliary, and the Museo de Arte de Puerto Rico,  Her work, Araña, was acquired by the Smithsonian American Art Museum as part of the Renwick Gallery's 50th Anniversary Campaign.

Publications 

 2022: "Mastering Sculpture: The Figure in Clay: A Guide to Capturing the Human Form for Ceramic Artists", Quarry Books,April 2022
 2014: “Ceramic Top 40”, Ferrin, Leslie, Ferrin Contemporary, 2014.
 2012: “The Body Eloquent”, Lovelace, Joyce. American Craft magazine, Feb/March 2012.
 2012: “Retablos, joyas, plateria y arte colección acosta de San Juan, Puerto Rico (1695-2010)”, Acosta Stolberg, Robert, Editorial Reves, November 2012.
 2010: “Art Market Insights: Art at the Crossroads”, O’hern, John. American Art Collector, Issue 39, January 2010.
 2010: “Cristina Córdova”, Howley, Paul. The Laurel of Asheville, July 2010
 2009: “Cristina Córdova: Entre Tierra”, Sanz De Arellano López, Isabel P., Imágen, mayo 2009.
 2009: “Umbral de lo surreal”, García Benítez, Mariana. Arq.i.tec 3.4, junio 2009.
 2009: “ENTRE TIERRA: Nueva escultura en cerámica por Cristina Córdova (English/Español)”, Fred Rivera, Ivette y Ramos Collado, Lilliana, ARTES (artesrp.com), mayo 2009.
 2008: “Possibilities: Rising Stars of Contemporary Craft in North Carolina”, Dobbs Ariatl, Kate, American Craft Magazine, October–November 2008.
 2007: “Creadora de enigmas”, El Nuevo Dia, 14 de diciembre del 2007.
 2007: “Cristina Córdova: Magic Realism”, Feaster, Felicia. Creative Loafing, May 2007.
 2006: “From the Inside Out—Two Views on the Creation and Experience of Cristina Cordova's Clay Sculptures”, Schultz, Katey and Hillman, Linda. Ceramics Art in Perception, 2006.
 2006: “Reviews: Cristina Cordova”, Dobbs Ariail, Kate. American Craft, September– August 2006.
 2005: “Body Language”, Camper, Fred. Chicago Reader, May 2005.
 2005: “The Figure in Clay”, Tourtillot, Suzanne. Lark Books, 2005.
 2004: “Dark Horse”, Lucas, Scott. Creative Loafing, May 2004.
 2004: “500 Figures in Clay”, Editor Gunther, Verónica Alice. Lark Books, 2004.
 2004: “Transformation”, Shearing, Graham. American Craft, June/July 2004.
 2004: “Cristina Cordova: Mito, Memoria y lluvia”, Trelles, Rafael. El Nuevo Dia, March 2004.
 2003: “Enamorada de la cerámica", Alegre Barrios, Mario. El Nuevo Dia, 2003.
 2002: “Celebracion Femenina”, Alvarez Lezama, Manuel. El Nuevo Dia, 2002.
 2001: “Cristina Córdova: Mujeres Santas y Renacimientos”, Rodriguez, Jorge. El Vocero, 2001.
 2000: “My Experiences and Impressions”, Xiaoping, Luo. Sculpture, 2000.3, vol. 23, 2000.
 2000: “Cerámica Escultural”, Alvarez Lezama, Manuel. El Nuevo Día, 2000.

References

1976 births
Living people
Puerto Rican sculptors
American women sculptors
Puerto Rican women sculptors
New York State College of Ceramics alumni
21st-century American women artists
21st-century American sculptors
Artists from Boston
Sculptors from Massachusetts